Thyrocopa geminipuncta is a moth of the family Xyloryctidae. It was first described by Lord Walsingham in 1907. It is endemic to the Hawaiian islands of Maui and Molokai.

The length of the forewings is 10–11 mm. Adults have been collected in May and September.

External links

Thyrocopa
Endemic moths of Hawaii
Biota of Maui
Biota of Molokai
Moths described in 1907